The Marketplace substation is a major electric power interconnection point in the western United States outside of Boulder City, Nevada. The station is in the Eldorado Valley.

Interconnects
 500 kV McCullough substation
 500 kV AC Adelanto substation, 1,291 MW, 
 500 kV AC Mead substation, continues to Westwing via Perkins Switchyard, 1,923 MW,

Power plants
 500 kV Copper Mountain Solar Facility

Proposed

 500 kV AC Moenkopi substation , on hold

Future 

Several high voltage direct current (HVDC) projects include a converter station, which may be connected to Marketplace.

Notes 

Buildings and structures in Clark County, Nevada
Western Interconnection
Energy infrastructure in Nevada